Saint Marianeh church (pronounced Surp Mariané), also known as Saint Marineh, is a medieval Armenian church located in the town of Ashtarak in the Aragatsotn Province of Armenia.  Nearby are the churches of Karmravor (located southeast of the Saint Marianeh), Spitakavor, Tsiranavor, and Surp Sarkis.  There is also a unique bridge of 1664 in the gorge nearby. Saint Marianeh church is clearly visible from across the gorge at Saint Sargis church. The church sits adjacent to Smbat Shahaziz road, between Perch Proshyan and Parpetsi roads though it is easiest reached via a vacant lot southeast of the complex.

Architecture 
Saint Marianeh church was built in 1271 (according to some sources 1281), and has proportions peculiar to the given period of its construction.  It has a rectangular plan from the exterior and a cruciform central-plan from the interior, and two-tiered side-chapels join the apse from the western and eastern sides.  Of particular interest is the church's drum that is circular from the interior and decahedral from the exterior.  A tall dome rests on top. Façades of the church, drum, and dome are simply adorned with cruciform decorations around the rectangular windows. The main portal into the structure is at the southern wall, with a belfry over this wing built in 1838.  Another portal leads into the church from the western wall.  Adjacent to the western wing of the church, is an unfinished 20th century basilica with the remainders of a fortified wall built of unprocessed blocks of basalt.

References

Bibliography

External links 

 Armeniapedia.org: Saint Marianeh Church

Churches completed in 1271
13th-century Oriental Orthodox church buildings
Armenian Apostolic churches in Ashtarak
Tourist attractions in Aragatsotn Province
13th-century churches in Armenia